The 2001 WNBA season was the fifth for the Phoenix Mercury. Cynthia Cooper became the second head coach in franchise history.

Offseason

WNBA Draft

Regular season

Season standings

Season Schedule

Player stats
Note: GP= Games played;  REB= Rebounds; AST= Assists; STL = Steals; BLK = Blocks; PTS = Points

References

External links 
Mercury on Basketball Reference

Phoenix Mercury seasons
Phoenix
Phoenix Mercury